Solanke is a Nigerian and Indian surname that may refer to:

Ade Solanke,  British-Nigerian playwright and screenwriter
Dominic Solanke (born 1997), English footballer
Folake Solanke (born 1932), Nigerian lawyer, administrator, and social critic
Iyiola Solanke, academic lawyer
Jimi Solanke (born 1942), Nigerian film actor, dramatist, folk singer, poet and playwright
Ladipo Solanke (c. 1886–1958), Nigerian political activist 
Prakashdada Solanke (born 1955), Indian politician
Sundarrao Solanke (1927–2014), Indian politician

See also 
Solanki

Surnames of African origin
Surnames of Indian origin